Kodithuwakku Arachchilage Lakshan Chathuranga Kodithuwakku (born 16 August 1995 as චතුරංග කොඩිතුවක්කු), popularly as Chathuranga Kodithuwakku is an actor in Sri Lankan television and a model. He is best known for the role "Nimesh" in television serial Hadawathe Kathawa.

Personal life
Chathuranga was born on 16 August 1995 in Homagama as the only child of the family. His father Mahinda Kodithuwakku was a machine operator at State printing cooperation and mother Mallika Alwis Jayasinghe is a housewife. He started primary education from Subharathi Mahamaathya Maha Vidyalaya, Godagama and then completed secondary education from D. S. Senanayake College, Colombo. He excelled in cricket during school times and was a member of school's media society. In the school, he won the award for the Best upcoming photographer of the year in 2013. He also studied at Sri Lanka Media Training Institute (SLMTI).

He is engaged to popular actress and model Miyasi Sandeepani. He first met her during a photo shoot in 2019.

Career
Before entering drama, he started photography at a young age and was the chief photographer for Let me know.lk for a while. He first involved in television commercials. On 12 February 2014, he started modeling career. During this period, in 2018, he acted in the music videos Agarajini sung by Harshana Wijesinghe in 2018 and then in Facebook Love sung by RapZilla with Randhir Withana. In 2019, he acted in the music video As Gawa sung by Nehara Peiris. Then he joined with adventure reality program Derana Thathwika telecast by TV Derana. 

In 2019, Chathuranga was selected to the main role "Nimesh" for the television serial Hadawathe Kathawa by the director Sriyantha Prasad. The serial telecast by Swarnavahini and his role was highly popularized among the young generation. In 2022, he made the lead role in the television serial Lan Wee.

References

External links
 
 Official Facebook fan page
 Instagram page
 18 වෙනිදාට ස්වර්ණවාහිනියෙන් මුළු රටටම අලූත් බලාපොරොත්තුවක්

Interviews
 මට ගොඩක්ම ගෑනු ආකර්ශනය වැඩියි
 හදවතේ කතාවේ නිමේෂ්
 මේ දවස්වල කෙල්ලොන්ගේ Crush එක
 නිමේෂ් කියන චරිතය මගේ ජීවිතේට සමානයි

1995 births
Living people
Sinhalese male actors
Sri Lankan male models
People from Colombo District
Alumni of D. S. Senanayake College